Amati is the last name of a family of Italian violin makers who lived at Cremona from about 1538 to 1740, and may refer specifically to:

 Andrea Amati (v. 1505/1510–1577)
 Antonio Amati (1540–1638), son of Andrea Amati
 Girolamo Amati (1561–1630), son of Andrea Amati
 Niccolò Amati (1596–1684), son of Girolamo Amati
 Girolamo Amati (Hieronymus II) (1649–1740), son of Niccolò Amati

Amati may also refer to:

 Amati (ritual), a fertility cult in Western Assam, India
 Amati Cars, a planned but cancelled Mazda luxury brand
 Amati-Denak, a Czech musical instrument manufacturing company
 Amati Quartet, a Canadian string quartet
 19183 Amati, a main-belt asteroid
 Amaţi, a village in Păuleşti, Satu Mare, Romania

Other people with the surname
  (1780–1830), Italian author
 Carlo Amati (1776–1852), Italian architect
 Daniele Amati (born 1931), Italian theoretical physicist
 Edmondo Amati (1920–2002), Italian film producer
 Federico Pedini Amati (born 1976), San-Marino politician
  (1778–1850), Italian Catholic theologian
  (1768–1834), Italian classical philologist, Graecist, epigraphist, paleographer, and manuscript historian
 Giovanna Amati (born 1959), Italian automobile racer
 Pasquale Amati (1716–1796), Italian scholar
 Silvana Amati (born 1947), Italian politician
 Tony Ray Amati (born 1976), American serial killer

See also
 Giovanni Antonio Amato (surname sometimes rendered as Amati)  (1475–1555), Italian painter

Italian-language surnames